German submarine U-707 was a Type VIIC U-boat of Nazi Germany's Kriegsmarine during World War II.

Ordered 6 August 1940, she was laid down 2 January 1941 and launched 18 December 1941. She had a relatively brief career from 1 July 1942 until 9 November 1943, and during this time she was commanded by Oberleutnant zur See Günther Gretschel.

Design
German Type VIIC submarines were preceded by the shorter Type VIIB submarines. U-707 had a displacement of  when at the surface and  while submerged. She had two shafts and two  propellers.

U-707 was fitted with five  torpedo tubes (four fitted at the bow and one at the stern), fourteen torpedoes, one  SK C/35 naval gun, 220 rounds, and two twin  C/30 anti-aircraft guns. The boat had a complement of between forty-four and sixty.

Patrol History
During her career, U-707 sunk two ships, for a total tonnage of 11,811 GRT, namely the US freighter Jonathan Sturges, a straggler of convoy ON 166, and the British freighter North Britain also a straggler of convoy ONS 5.

Wolfpacks
U-707 participated in nine wolfpacks, namely:
Haudegen (26 January – 2 February 1943) 
Nordsturm (2 – 9 February 1943) 
Haudegen (9 – 15 February 1943)
Taifun (15 – 20 February 1943) 
Specht (19 April – 4 May 1943) 
Fink (4 – 6 May 1943) 
Naab (12 – 15 May 1943) 
Donau 2 (15 – 26 May 1943) 
Schill (25 October – 9 November 1943)

Fate
While on patrol east of the Azores, she was depth charged and sunk on 9 November 1943 from a RAF Fortress aircraft, from Sqdn. 220/J R.A.F, at position . She was lost with all hands; 51 dead.

Summary of raiding history

References

Bibliography

External links

German Type VIIC submarines
U-boats commissioned in 1941
1941 ships
U-boats sunk in 1943
World War II submarines of Germany
Ships built in Hamburg
U-boats sunk by British aircraft
U-boats sunk by depth charges
World War II shipwrecks in the Atlantic Ocean
Shipwrecks in the Bay of Biscay
Ships lost with all hands
Maritime incidents in November 1943